The Annie Walsh Memorial School is an all-girls secondary school in Freetown, Sierra Leone. It was established in 1849 originally in Charlotte, a newly established village for recaptives. It is claimed to be the oldest girls school in Sub-Saharan Africa. Over the years, the school has consistently outperformed its peers in terms of academic achievement, making it the most prestigious secondary school for girls in Sierra Leone. The school's Principal is currently Mrs OPhelia Morrison (née  Barber).

School history
The first school open for girls in Freetown was the school of Sarah Hartwig, but this school had been temporary.

Annie Walsh Memorial School was named after an Irish or English girl whose dream was to become a missionary to Africa. Unfortunately Annie Walsh died in a tragic accident at the age of 20. Annie Walsh's last few days are described in 'Dear Annie: A Brief Memorial' published for private circulation and undated.  On 19 January 1855 she returned from a week in Bath.  On 23 January she went, with her father, to a meeting of the Irish Church Missions, despite having the symptoms of a cold.  On 24 and 25 January she remained in bed, apparently because of the cold.  On 27 January a doctor was called.  The next day, Sunday, inflammation of the lungs was apparent.  Leeches were applied and again on Monday.  On that Monday morning she spoke with her parents - 'that conversation had all the air of a final interview between friends that parting for longish voyage'.  She died at 4.30 a.m. on Wednesday, 31 January 1855. Her parents provided substantial funding for the school when it was started, by the Church  Missionary Society,  which ultimately became the Annie Walsh Memorial School.  The  present  location  is a new  location as the  school quickly outgrew  its  original  building.

Past principals
Miss Julia Sass (1849–1869)
Mrs. Caiger (1869–1870)
Ms. Caspari, (1875-1878)
Ms. Bisset (1894-1917)
Miss Winifred Hamblet (19**-1930)
Miss Pole (1930–1954)
Miss Colebeck (1954–1961)
Mrs. Lati Hyde-Forster (1961–1975)
Mrs. Europa Wilson-Agwu (1975–1985)
Madame Gracie Williams (1985–1995)
Mrs A. C. Roberts (1995-2005)

House system
The school is divided into six houses, named after the first principals.

 Dunkley - [Red] 
 Sass - [Blue]
 Pole - [Green]
 Caspari - [Yellow]
 Hamblet - [Pink]
 Bissett - [Purple]

Notable alumni
Zainab Bangura: Foreign Minister of Sierra Leone, and founder of Campaign for Good Governance
Hannah Benka-Coker: educator; founder of Freetown Secondary School for Girls (FSSG) in 1926
Sara Forbes Bonetta: African Princess and Queen Victoria's (England) goddaughter 
Irene Ighodaro: first female medical doctor in West Africa
Sia Koroma: First Lady  of Sierra Leone
Nemata Majeks-Walker, women's rights activist
Lati Hyde-Forster: first female graduate of Fourah Bay College, cousin of Thomas Decker
Yema Lucilda Hunter, nee Caulker: author and retired WHO Librarian
Jeillo Edwards: actress
Stella Thomas: lawyer
Nkechi Agwu: mathematician
Chidi Blyden: foreign policy advisor

See also
 Sarah Hartwig (missionary)

References

External links
 Annie Walsh Memorial School Old Girls Association
 Annie Walsh Old Girls Association UK Branch

Educational institutions established in 1849
Schools in Freetown
Girls' schools in Sierra Leone
1849 establishments in Sierra Leone